Five Mile Bridge may refer to:

 Maestri Bridge, across Lake Pontchartrain, Louisiana, United States
 Five Mile Bridge, a listed building in Lyne, Scottish Borders
 Five Mile Bridge, a bridge on Ohio State Route 555 over the Muskingum River
 Five Mile Bridge, a footbridge across the Witham in Fiskerton, Lincolnshire, England

See also 
 Five Mile River (disambiguation)
 Five mile (disambiguation)